Caroline Waters OBE is deputy chair of the UK's Equality and Human Rights Commission (appointed in January 2013). She is also Vice President of Carers UK, and was Director of People and Policy at BT. She is on the Sustainable Care Advisory Board which advises the Economic and Social Research Council's Sustainable Care Large Grant programme.

In 2010 she was awarded an OBE for her work on progressive human resources practice, diversity and equal opportunities.

References

British women in business
Living people
Year of birth missing (living people)